Russell J. York (August 5, 1921 – July 22, 2006)  was a native of Waterville, Maine who served in World War II in 1942-1945 as a combat medic assigned to the 4th Engineer Battalion of the U.S. 4th Infantry Division. He landed at Utah Beach  on D-Day under the command of Gen. Theodore Roosevelt, Jr. and with the U.S. 22d Infantry Regiment served in the campaigns in Northern France, Rhineland, Battle of the Bulge and Central Europe.

York was interviewed in 2005 for the Veterans' History Project about his service. The tape is available for the public through that organization at the Library of Congress's veteran's website

Silver Star citation
In the battle for the Hurtgen Forest, with the writer Ernest Hemingway, serving under Colonel, later Major General Charles T. Lanham, York earned the Silver Star.

During the incident York ran out of tourniquet material and went to Major General Raymond O. Barton, his commander, and requested the General lend him his belt. He did and York went back in to treat more men.

Additional service
York is reported to have been at the Nazi concentration camp at Buchenwald sometime during 1945, where a contingent of American press including the CBS News correspondent Edward R. Murrow arrived on April 15, 1945. However, his units weren't involved in the liberation of the camp on April 11, 1945. At the end of April, the U.S. 4th Infantry Division liberated a sub-camp of the Dachau concentration camp near Haunstetten. Prisoners from the Buchenwald camp were transferred into this region at the time.

York turned down a Purple Heart so as to not worry his mother, and because he felt coughing up blood from a concussion paled compared to what he'd seen others endure on a daily basis. He shared the incident with  Hemingway, "who suffered four concussions in two years during World War II." In Company "C" he was known as "Doc." His jacket, medals, dog tags and Bible are on display at the 4th Infantry Division museum at Fort Carson, Colorado.

Awards
  Silver Star
  Bronze Star
  Good Conduct Medal
 Presidential Unit Citation
  European-African-Middle Eastern Campaign Medal With  Arrowhead device and one Silver Service star
  American Campaign Medal
  Army of Occupation Medal with Germany clasp
  World War II Victory Medal
  Belgian Fourragere
  Honorable Service Lapel Button World War II
  Combat Medical Badge

See also

References

Further reading
MacDonald, Charles B. The Battle For the Huertgen Forest: 
Rush, Robert S. Hell in the Hurtgen Forest: 
Hemingway, Ernest M. By-Line: Ernest Hemingway: 
Across the River and Into the Trees: 
4th Engineer Combat Battalion
4th Engineer Battalion

1921 births
2006 deaths
United States Army personnel of World War II
United States Army soldiers
Recipients of the Silver Star
Military personnel from Maine